Andrew Muldoon is an American pair skater. With partner Carissa Guild, he is the 1996 U.S. novice silver medalist. They won the bronze medal at the 1997-1998 ISU Junior Series event in Slovakia and placed 12th at the 1997 World Junior Figure Skating Championships. 

Muldoon also competed with partners Naomi Grabow and Ingrid Goldberg. He skated professionally in Disney on Ice, Radio City Music Hall's Christmas Spectacular, and Cold Rhythm.

Andrew Muldoon is a graduate of Edinboro University of Pennsylvania where he became a brother of the Gamma Lambda chapter of Theta Xi fraternity.

Muldoon is currently the cohost of "Let's Tuesday", a weekly podcast distributed through Whooshkaa.

In retirement, Muldoon has achieved CFRE status and served as a Senior Director of Development at the University of Rochester Medical Center's Highland Hospital.

Muldoon cofounded a monthly movie club and provided the name for "SHARE" meetings at the University of Rochester, at which fundraising professionals Share Information; Help each other become the most effective team; Acknowledge great work; and Educate one another about program successes. He held a semiannual trivia event at the Bloch Center of University of Rochester, regaling participants with his delivery.

Muldoon skippered the Bloch Ness monsters to several consecutive URMC Championships.

Results
Pairs (with Guild)

References

 1996 U.S. Figure Skating Championships

External links
 Pairs on Ice: Carissa Guild & Andrew Muldoon

American male pair skaters
1979 births
Living people